Megachile sinensis is a species of bee in the family Megachilidae. It was described by Yan-Ru Wu in 1985.

References

Sinensis
Insects described in 1985